Picano is a surname. Notable people with the surname include:

Felice Picano (born 1944), American writer, publisher, and critic 
Giuseppe Picano (1716–1810), Italian sculptor

Surnames of Italian origin